Anne McClintock (born 1964) is a Zimbabwean-South African writer, feminist scholar and public intellectual who has published widely on issues of sexuality, race, imperialism, and nationalism; popular and visual culture, photography, advertising and cultural theory. Transnational and interdisciplinary in character, her work explores the interrelations of gender, race, and class power within imperial modernity, spanning Victorian and contemporary Britain to contemporary South Africa, Ireland, and the United States. Since 2015, McClintock is the A. Barton Hepburn Professor in the Program in Gender and Sexuality Studies, and also affiliated with the Princeton Environmental Institute and the Department of English at Princeton University.

Previously, McClintock was the Simone de Beauvoir Professor of English and Women's and Gender Studies at the University of Wisconsin–Madison where she taught from 1999 to 2015. Before Wisconsin, she taught at both Columbia University and New York University.

References

Further reading 

Zimbabwean people of British descent
South African feminists
White South African anti-apartheid activists
South African women's rights activists
Living people
Scholars of nationalism
Zimbabwean emigrants to South Africa
Zimbabwean feminists
Zimbabwean philosophers
South African women
Zimbabwean women writers
1954 births